Eriophorum chamissonis is a species of flowering plant belonging to the family Cyperaceae.

Its native range is Subarctic to Western Central USA.

Synonym:
 Eriophorum russeolum Fr.

References

chamissonis